The 2022 United States Senate election in Arizona was held on November 8, 2022, to elect a member of the United States Senate to represent the state of Arizona.

The seat was previously held by Republican John McCain, who won his final term in 2016. McCain died on August 25, 2018, and Governor Doug Ducey appointed former U.S. Senator Jon Kyl to fill the seat. Kyl resigned at the end of that year and Ducey replaced him with Martha McSally, who then lost to Democrat Mark Kelly in 2020. Primaries in Arizona took place on August 2. Kelly won renomination without opposition, while venture capitalist Blake Masters won the Republican nomination against a large field of candidates. Although Arizona typically leans Republican, Kelly led Masters by low single digits in aggregate polling. Kelly held a significant fundraising advantage until many Republican aligned groups began spending to assist Masters in the final weeks of the campaign. On November 1, Libertarian nominee Marc Victor dropped out of the race and endorsed Masters.

Incumbent Democrat Mark Kelly won reelection, defeating Republican nominee Blake Masters by a comfortable margin. The race was competitive and seen as crucial to determining party control of the U.S. Senate; with Kelly's victory in Arizona and a Democratic victory in Nevada, it was projected on November 12 that the Democratic caucus would retain control of the Senate in the 118th United States Congress.

Democratic primary

Candidates

Nominee
 Mark Kelly, incumbent U.S. Senator

Endorsements

Results

Republican primary

Candidates

Nominee
 Blake Masters, former president of the Thiel Foundation and former chief operating officer of Thiel Capital

Eliminated in primary
 Mark Brnovich, Arizona Attorney General
 Jim Lamon, solar power businessman
 Mick McGuire, retired U.S. Air Force major general and former adjutant general of the Arizona National Guard
 Justin Olson, member of the Arizona Corporation Commission

Did not file 
 Craig Brittain
 Robert Paveza, software engineer

Declined 
 Kirk Adams, former Chief of Staff to Governor Doug Ducey and former Speaker of the Arizona House of Representatives
 Andy Biggs, U.S. Representative for 
 Doug Ducey, Governor of Arizona
 Kari Lake, former KSAZ-TV news anchor (ran for governor)
 Jack McCain, veteran and son of former U.S. Senator John McCain
 Kelli Ward, chair of the Arizona Republican Party, former state senator, and candidate for the U.S. Senate in 2016 and 2018
 Kimberly Yee, State Treasurer of Arizona (ran for re-election)

Endorsements

Polling
Aggregate polls

Graphical summary

Results

Libertarian primary

Candidates

Nominee
 Marc Victor, attorney and nominee for U.S. Senate in 2012 (withdrew from general election, endorsed Blake Masters)

Results

General election

Initially expected to be one of the most widely contested elections in the nation, Kelly amassed a massive fundraising advantage over Masters, raising a record $75 million dollars, compared to Masters's $12 million. Due to the Supreme Court's ruling to overturn Roe Vs. Wade, which gave states the right to ban abortion, Kelly spent heavily attacking Masters over his anti abortion stance, which was seen as hurting Masters especially among women voters. He also attacked Masters's support for privatizing social security, as Arizona has many retired seniors whom use the program. Masters's belief that the 2020 presidential election was stolen also hurt him among voters.

With the limited amount of money he had, Masters's attempted to portray Kelly as weak on illegal immigration, supportive of spending programs that caused inflation, and too supportive of President Joe Biden. In the final weeks of the campaign, Republican groups began to increase the amount of money they were spending on the race, and many news outlets moved the race from Lean Democrat to tossup. However, in the end Kelly relatively easily defeated Masters, which helped to allow Democrats to retain the Senate.

Predictions

Debates

Endorsements

Polling
Aggregate polls

Graphical summary

Mark Kelly vs. Mark Brnovich

Mark Kelly vs. Jim Lamon

Mark Kelly vs. Michael McGuire

Mark Kelly vs. Andy Biggs

Mark Kelly vs. Doug Ducey

Mark Kelly vs. Kelli Ward

Mark Kelly vs. Kari Lake

Mark Kelly vs. Jack McCain

Mark Kelly vs. Kimberly Yee

Mark Kelly vs. generic Republican

Mark Kelly vs. generic opponent

 Generic Democrat vs. generic Republican

Results

By County

By Congressional District
Kelly won 5 out of 9 congressional districts, including two that elected Republican representatives.

See also
 2022 United States Senate elections
 2022 United States House of Representatives elections in Arizona
 2022 Arizona gubernatorial election
 2022 Arizona elections

Notes

Partisan clients

References

External links 
Official campaign websites
 Mark Kelly (D) for Senate
 Blake Masters (R) for Senate

2022
Arizona
United States Senate